Gloria Elizabeth Reuben is a Canadian-American actress, producer, and singer. She is well-known for her role as Jeanie Boulet on the medical drama ER (1995–1999, 2008), for which she was twice nominated for an Emmy Award, and for portraying Elizabeth Keckley in the 2012 Steven Spielberg–directed film Lincoln.

Additionally, she has been featured in films such as Timecop (1994), Nick of Time (1995), Admission (2013), and Reasonable Doubt (2014). She played Krista Gordon on Mr. Robot  (2015–2019), as well as a recurring character on City on a Hill (since 2019). She also played Adina Johnson on Cloak & Dagger from 2018 to 2019.

Early life
Gloria Reuben was born in Toronto, Ontario, to Pearl Avis (Mills), a classical singer, and Cyril George Reuben, an engineer. Her parents are both Jamaican-born. Her father was mostly Jewish (with Ashkenazi and Sephardi roots), though he also had some African ancestry; her mother is of mostly African descent. Her father died when she was young. Reuben was the subject of a segment of Henry Louis Gates Jr.'s television genealogy series Finding Your Roots.

Reuben grew up one of six children. Her older half-brother, Denis Simpson, was an actor and children's television host and died in 2010. Her younger brother David died in 1988. Reuben details her relationship and experience with the deaths of her brothers in her 2019 memoir My Brothers' Keeper.

Reuben began learning piano as a child and later studied music technique and theory, ballet and jazz at the Royal Conservatory of Music.

Career

Screen acting 
Reuben began her career as an actress after having a few jobs as a model and in television advertisements.

Reuben came to prominence on the American television series ER as Jeanie Boulet, an HIV-positive physician assistant on the hospital's staff. She was a guest star throughout the first season and was promoted to full-time cast member at the beginning of the second. She continued that role until early in the sixth season. In 2008, Reuben returned to ER for one episode during its 14th season. She has stated that this role led to her HIV/AIDS activism. In 1996, she was chosen by People magazine as one of the 50 Most Beautiful People in the World. 

Reuben again held a major role in a television series when she starred as FBI agent Brooke Haslett in 1-800-Missing (2003–2004). She later starred as Rosalind Whitman in the TNT series Raising the Bar.

Reuben guest-starred in the season two finale of Drop Dead Diva as Professor Kathy Miller. Reuben guest-starred in season 12 of NBC's Law & Order: Special Victims Unit, reprising her role as U.S. Attorney Christine Danielson. In 2012, she appeared in the CBS TV movie Jesse Stone: Benefit of the Doubt. In 2012, Reuben played Elizabeth Keckley in the historical drama film Lincoln and her portrayal of the character received critical praise. In 2013, she guest starred on the sci-fi drama series Falling Skies.

In October 2014, it was announced that Reuben had joined the cast of the USA Network series Mr. Robot. Reuben plays Dr. Krista Gordon, the psychiatrist of the show's unstable main character, Elliott. The show premiered on in June 2015. She acted in all four seasons of the show. At first a recurring role, Reuben's character was upgraded to a season regular for the fourth and final season.

In 2017, Reuben was cast as Adina Johnson, mother of Tyrone Johnson, in the series Cloak & Dagger.

Stage acting 
In 1999, Reuben acted in an off-Broadway production of The Vagina Monologues. In 2006, she starred as Condoleezza Rice in the play Stuff Happens at the Public Theater. The following year, she won the Lucille Lortel Award for Outstanding Lead Actress, the preeminent honour for off-Broadway productions, for her portrayal. In 2008, she returned to the Public Theater for Conversations in Tusculum.

Music 
In 2000, Reuben sang backup vocals for Tina Turner on her Twenty Four Seven Tour.

Reuben is a regularly performing jazz singer and pianist. She released her first record, Just for You, in December 2007. Her second album, Perchance to Dream, was released in April 2015; it was her first jazz record. Her latest album, For All We Know, was released on February 14, 2020, on the MCG Jazz recording label, where she is accompanied by guitarist and Grammy winning producer Marty Ashby. She performed all around New York City in the fourth quarter of 2019 to promote her upcoming record.

Author 
On November 19, 2019, Reuben released a memoir, My Brothers' Keeper, detailing her journey and an exploration of the life she shared with her two brothers, as well as her emotions and experiences after their sudden deaths.

Personal life 
Reuben lives in Brooklyn, New York.

Activism 
Reuben is a committed social activist. In large part due to her role as an HIV-positive character in ER, she continues to raise awareness about the HIV/AIDS pandemic, lobbying for increased advocacy and speaking at several major fundraising events. She also takes great interest in global issues, predominantly climate change, nature, and human rights. Gloria Reuben is the president of Waterkeeper Alliance, an organization that strengthens and grows a global network of grassroots leaders protecting everyone’s right to clean water. She is also a special adviser on climate change for The Climate Reality Project, former United States vice president Al Gore's environmental organization. She was formerly on the board for the National Wildlife Federation. Reuben is also on the Leadership Council for the RFK Center for Justice and Human Rights.

Filmography

Films

Television

References

External links

 
 
 BroadwayWorld.com interview with Gloria Reuben, June 15, 2007

20th-century Canadian actresses
21st-century Canadian actresses
21st-century Black Canadian women singers
Living people
Actresses from Toronto
Canadian film actresses
Canadian television actresses
Canadian expatriate actresses in the United States
Musicians from Toronto
Canadian people of Jamaican descent
Canadian people of Jewish descent
The Royal Conservatory of Music alumni
Black Canadian actresses
Jewish Canadian actresses
Jewish Canadian musicians
Black Jewish people
Year of birth missing (living people)